Agwo Facula is a bright, irregular depression on the surface of Mercury, located at 22.4° N, 213.7° W.  It was named by the IAU in 2018.  Agwo is the Igbo word for snake.  The depression is the site of a volcanic explosion.

Agwo Facula is near the southwestern rim of the Caloris basin.  Agwo Facula is immediately northeast of Abeeso Facula.

References

Surface features of Mercury